Weltz is a surname of German origin. Notable people with the surname include:

Gerda Weltz (born 1951), Danish darts player
Johnny Weltz (born 1962), Danish road bicycle racer
Scott Weltz (born 1987), American competition swimmer

References

Surnames of German origin